Events in the year 2012 in Portugal.

Incumbents
President: Aníbal Cavaco Silva
Prime Minister: Pedro Passos Coelho

Events

May
1 May – 2012 Rush to Pingo Doce

September
15 September – 15 September 2012 Portuguese protests

Arts and entertainment
In music: Portugal in the Eurovision Song Contest 2012.

Sports
Football (soccer) competitions: Primeira Liga, Liga de Honra, Terceira Divisão, Taça da Liga, Taça de Portugal.

Deaths

4 February – Fernando Lanhas, painter (born 1923).
21 February – Manuel Franco da Costa de Oliveira Falcão, Roman Catholic prelate, Bishop of Beja (born 1922).
24 February – Infanta Maria Adelaide, royal (born 1912).
28 February – Jaime Graça, footballer (born 1942).

See also
List of Portuguese films of 2012

References

 
2010s in Portugal
Years of the 21st century in Portugal
Portugal
Portugal